Miss America 2000, the 73rd Miss America pageant, was held at the Boardwalk Hall in Atlantic City, New Jersey on Saturday, September 18, 1999 on ABC Network.

Heather French became the first Miss Kentucky to win the crown. She later married the state's lieutenant governor, Steve Henry.

Results

Placements

Order of announcements

Top 10

Top 5

Awards

Preliminary awards

Quality of Life awards

Other awards

Delegates

  Alabama – Julie Smith
  Alaska – Shannon Kelly
  Arizona – Lori Whiting
  Arkansas – Brandy Rhodes
  California – MaryAnne Sapio
  Colorado – Erin MacGregor
  Connecticut – Sylvia Gomes
  Delaware – Kama Katherine Boland
  District of Columbia – Toyia Taylor
  Florida – Kelli Meierhenry
  Georgia – Osjha Anderson
  Hawaii – Candes Meijide Gentry
  Idaho – Mellisa Kae Paul
  Illinois – Jade Smalls
  Indiana – Kelly Lloyd
  Iowa – Jennifer Caudle
  Kansas – Maureen Darby
  Kentucky – Heather French
  Louisiana – Julie Lawrence
  Maine – Rebecca Pelkey
  Maryland – Keri Schrader
  Massachusetts – April Marie Thiebeault
  Michigan – Audrie Chernauckas
  Minnesota – Natalie Lund
  Mississippi – Heather Soriano
  Missouri – Patryce CoRae King
  Montana – Elissa Ann Schwarz
  Nebraska – Becky Smith
  Nevada – Gina Giacinto
  New Hampshire – Brandee Helbick
  New Jersey – Victoria Andrews Paige
  New Mexico – Katie Linda Amalia Kelley
  New York – Brandi Burkhardt
  North Carolina – Kelly Trogdon
  North Dakota – Kay Picconatto
  Ohio – Tiffany Baumann
  Oklahoma – Daneka Danyell Allen
  Oregon – Angela Reed
  Pennsylvania – Susan Spafford
  Rhode Island – Karen Lindsay
  South Carolina – Danielle Davis
  South Dakota – Trisha Haroldson
  Tennessee – Allison Alderson
  Texas – Yanci Yarbrough
  Utah – Vanessa Ballam
  Vermont – Katy Johnson
  Virginia – Crystal Lewis
  Washington – Tina Willis
  West Virginia – Lucy Joanna Ours
  Wisconsin – Mary-Louise Kurey
  Wyoming – Elaine Dabney

Judges
Michael Badalucco
Gretchen Carlson
Tia Carrere
Mimi Kennedy
Briana Scurry
Judy Sheindlin
Larry Jenkins

External links
 Miss America official website

2000
1999 in the United States
1999 in New Jersey
2000 beauty pageants
September 1999 events in the United States
Events in Atlantic City, New Jersey